Kawan Figueiredo Pereira (born 17 June 2002) is a Brazilian diver. He competed in the 2020 Summer Olympics for Brazil.

At the 2019 Pan American Games, he won a bronze medal in the Men's synchronized 10 metre platform.

At just 19 years of age, he made history at the 2020 Olympic Games in Tokyo, being the first Brazilian to reach an Olympic final in diving, finishing in 10th place.

As part of the FINA open water mixed 3 metre springboard and 10 metre platform diving event, held as part of a diving exhibition at the Abu Dhabi Aquatics Festival in December 2021 in Abu Dhabi, United Arab Emirates, Pereira helped win the gold medal with a score of 416.35 points alongside teammates Luana Lira and Ingrid Oliveira.

References

External links

2002 births
Living people
Brazilian male divers
Olympic divers of Brazil
Divers at the 2020 Summer Olympics
People from Parnaíba
Pan American Games medalists in diving
Medalists at the 2019 Pan American Games
Sportspeople from Piauí
Pan American Games bronze medalists for Brazil
21st-century Brazilian people